Thomas D. Carson (born March 1911) was a unionist politician in Northern Ireland.

Born in Ballybay in County Monaghan, Carson studied at Clones High School, Campbell College and Queen's University Belfast.  He worked as a medical doctor before retiring in the early 1970s.  In retirement, he became politically active, as vice-chairman of the South Armagh Unionist Association in 1971/2, and then President in 1972/3.

In 1973, Carson resigned from the Ulster Unionist Party to join the Vanguard Unionist Progressive Party, and immediately elected in the 1973 Northern Ireland Assembly election for Armagh.  Following his election, he joined the Armagh County Executive of Vanguard, and also became a member of the Monday Club and the Commonwealth Parliamentary Association.

Carson held his Armagh seat on the Northern Ireland Constitutional Convention in 1975.  Outside politics, he spent his time gardening and birdwatching.

References

1911 births
Year of death missing
Alumni of Queen's University Belfast
Members of the Northern Ireland Assembly 1973–1974
Members of the Northern Ireland Constitutional Convention
People educated at Campbell College
Politicians from County Monaghan
Ulster Unionist Party politicians
Vanguard Unionist Progressive Party politicians